Sympetalandra is a genus of legume in the family Fabaceae. 
It contains the following species:
 Sympetalandra schmutzii
 Sympetalandra borneensis

References

Caesalpinioideae
Taxonomy articles created by Polbot
Fabaceae genera